Petie cameras were subminiature cameras manufactured and distributed by Walter Kunik of Frankfurt am Main, West Germany, during the 1950s and 1960s.

Description

At the end of World War II Japan produced simple, tiny and inexpensive Hit-type cameras designed for the war-torn and destitute home market. The Petie camera was created under similar conditions in post-war Germany. These cameras used 16mm film, against the 17.5mm film of the Japanese cameras, but both used paper-backed film and created 14mm square images. The Petie had a 20mm (f9.0) fixed-focus lens and a shutter speed set at 1/50 sec. The 1955 model came with a meniscus lens, later replaced with an achromatic lens. It came with accessories such as a closeup lens, yellow filter, lens hood, table top tripod, and case. All subsequent Kunik models were based on this one.

References

Cameras by brand